A cloudburst is an extreme case of rainfall.

Cloudburst may also refer to:

Cloudburst (1951 film), a 1951 film by Francis Searle
Cloudburst (2011 film), a 2011 Canadian film
Cloudburst, a company founded by NFL player Steve Wright that provides sideline misting systems 
Cloudburst (G.I. Joe), a fictional character in the G.I. Joe universe
Cloudburst (Whitacre), a musical composition by Eric Whitacre
"Cloudburst", a song by Oasis from their single "Live Forever"
Cloudburst, an album by Jon Hendricks
Cloudburst, the final movement of Ferde Grofé's Grand Canyon Suite 
Cloudbursting, a phenomenon in cloud computing
Cloud Burst, a televised story for children as part of the BBC Television series Look and Read, first broadcast in 1974
Cloudburst Mountain, a mountain in Canada